The coat of arms of the Lesser Poland Voivodeship, Poland features a white (silver) eagle with a yellow (golden) crown on his head that is turned left, a beak, legs, and a stripes on its wings, with the charge placed on the red background. It was designed by Wojciech Drelicharz, Zenon Piech, and Barbara Widłak, and adopted in 1999.

Design 
The coat of arms of the Lesser Poland Voivodeship is a red Iberian style escutcheon with square top and rounded base. It features a white (silver) eagle with a yellow (golden) crown on his head that is turned left, a beak, legs, and a stripes on its wings.Uchwała Nr VIII/73/99 Sejmiku Województwa Małopolskiego z dnia 24 maja 1999 r. w sprawie herbu i flagi Województwa Małopolskiego. Biuletyny Informacji Publicznej Województwa Małopolskiego. Kraków. 24 May 1999Włodzimierz Chorązki: Małopolska heraldyka''. vol. 2. 2000. p. 99—114.

History 

The design of the coat of arms had originated as the symbol of the Kraków Land, a land (administrative subdivision) of Poland in the Middle Ages.Jan Długosz: Insigniorum clenodiorum Regis et Regni Polonie descriptio. In: Jan Długosz: Insignia seu Clenodia Regis et Regni Poloniae. It depicted a white (silver) eagle with a yellow (golden) crown on his head that is turned right, a beak, legs, and a stripes on its wings, with the charge placed on the red background. In 14th century, after 1314, the design became the coat of arms of then-established Kraków Voivodeship, that was formed within the borders of the Kraków Land.Barbara Miodońska: Przedstawienie państwa polskiego w Statucie Łaskiego z r. 1506, In: Folia Historiae Artium, vol. 5, Kraków, 1968. p. 34. It was used until 1795, when the voivodeship had ceased to exist following the Third Partition of Poland. It was once again used as the coat of arms of the Kraków Voivodeship of the Congress Poland, that existed from 1816 to 1837, and then as the coat of arms of the Kraków Governorate, from 1837 to 1841. In 1841, the subdivision was replaced by the Kielce Governorate, which continued to use said coat of arms until 1844, when it ceased to exist.

In 1928, as part of the project to design the coat of arms for the voivodeships of the Second Polish Republic, the design for the coat of arms of the Kraków Voivodeship had been created. Though planned to be officially approved, it never was, as it was decided to postpone the approval of the subdivision symbols due to the planned administrative reform, that eventually took place in 1938. Eventually, the plans for the establishment of the coat of arms had been stopped by the Invasion of Poland by Nazi Germany, on 1 September 1939, that begun the World War II, and were not picked up back after the end of the conflict. The proposed design featured a white eagle with a yellow (golden) crown on his head that is turned right, a beak, legs, and a stripes on its wings, with the charge being placed on the red background.Projekt Rozporządzenia Prezydenta Rzeczypospolitej Polskiej w sprawie nadania herbów województwom, AAN, PRM 59-10, p. 18-21.

The currently-used coat of arms of the Lesser Poland Voivodeship had been designed by Wojciech Drelicharz and Zenon Piech, and its artwork had been made by Barbara Widłak. It had been adopted by the Lesser Poland Voivodeship Sejmik on 24 May 1999.

See also 
 flag of the Lesser Poland Voivodeship

References 

Lesser Poland
Lesser Poland Voivodeship
Lesser Poland Voivodeship
1999 establishments in Poland
Coats of arms with eagles
Kraków Voivodeship (14th century – 1795)
Kraków Voivodeship (1919–1939)
Lesser Poland
History of Lesser Poland